is a Japanese politician serving in the House of Representatives in the Diet (national legislature) as a member of the New Komeito Party. A native of Osaka, Osaka and graduate of Osaka Prefecture University he was elected for the first time in 2005.

References

External links 
 Official website in Japanese.

Living people
1949 births
New Komeito politicians
Members of the House of Representatives (Japan)
21st-century Japanese politicians
Japanese accountants